Via Roma is an important street of Palermo. It represents one of the main axes of the historic centre and connect the Palermo Centrale railway station to the Teatro Politeama. Several important buildings of the city appears along the street's path. Via Roma was designed with the 1885 Master Plan of Palermo (the so-called "Piano Giarrusso") and built between 1894 and 1936.

Places of interest 
 Vucciria
 Piazza San Domenico
 Church of San Domenico
 Church of Sant'Antonio Abate
 Anglican Church of the Holy Cross
 Palazzo delle Poste
 Palazzo delle Ferrovie
 Teatro Biondo

References

Books 
 Chirco A., Di Liberto M., Via Roma: la strada nuova del Novecento, Flaccovio, 2008

Roma